Sate Ei Chay Yar is a 2019 Burmese drama television series. It aired on MRTV-4, from February 12 to March 7, 2019, on Mondays to Fridays at 19:00 for 18 episodes.

Cast
Kyaw Htet Zaw as Myat Htun, Wai Lwin
Wint Yamone Naing as Khin Kyawt May, Chaw Yupar
Phone Shein Khant as Htun Naing
Wai Yan Kyaw as Yan Naing
Han Na Lar as Sandi Myint
Phu Sone

References

Burmese television series
MRTV (TV network) original programming